Blauer Stein is a basalt mountain of Baden-Württemberg, Germany. 

Mountains and hills of Baden-Württemberg